The 2012 Castle Point Borough Council election took place on 3 May 2012 to elect members of Castle Point Borough Council in Essex, England. One third of the council was up for election and the Conservative party stayed in overall control of the council.

After the election, the composition of the council was
Conservative 25
Canvey Island Independent Party 15
Independent 1

Background
Since the last election in 2011, 3 councillors for the Canvey Island Independent Party, Joan Liddiard, Anne and Brian Wood, formed their own Canvey Independent Group, after Brian Wood had been expelled from the party in November 2011. Anne and Brian Wood stood at the 2012 election as independent candidates, along with 13 candidates each from the Conservative and Labour parties, 5 from the Canvey Island Independent Party and 2 from the Green party.

One Conservative councillor, Enid Isaacs of Victoria ward, stood down at the election.

Election result
The Conservatives retained a 9-seat majority on the council after holding all of the seats they had been defending. The closest they came to losing a seat was in St Mary's ward where they held on with a majority of 63 votes over Labour, which meant Labour failed to win any seats at the election. Meanwhile, the Canvey Island Independent Party regained seats in both Canvey East and Canvey South defeating independents Anne and Brian Wood.

Ward results

References

Castle Point Borough Council elections
2012 English local elections
2010s in Essex